Agterberg is a Dutch surname. Notable people with the surname include:

 Cesco Agterberg (born 1975), Dutch football coach
 Cris Agterberg (1883–1948), Dutch artist and ceramicist
 Frits Agterberg (born 1936), Dutch geologist

See also
 Achterberg (surname)

Dutch-language surnames